Lincoln Gap may refer to:
Lincoln Gap, South Australia
Lincoln Gap Wind Farm
Lincoln Gap (Vermont)